The Genairco Biplane (also known as the Genairco Moth) was a utility biplane built in small numbers in Australia in the late 1920s and early 1930s.

Design and construction
It was a conventional single-bay biplane with fixed tailskid undercarriage, with a fuselage based on the de Havilland Moth and wings based on the Avro Avian. The fuselage, however, was wider than that of the Moth, allowing two passengers to be carried seated side-by-side in an open cockpit ahead of the pilot's. Some later examples of the type featured an enclosed cabin for the passengers, and these were known as Genairco Cabin Biplanes, with the original design retrospectively named the Genairco Open Biplane.

Survivors
Three Genairco biplanes have survived.

Australia
Airworthy
VH-UOD, an Open Biplane, was restored and is maintained in airworthy condition.

Stored
VH-UOG, an Open Biplane, is owned by the Museum of Applied Arts and Sciences, also known as the Powerhouse Museum, in Sydney, New South Wales.

United States
Stored
N240G (previously VH-UOH and then VH-UUI), a Cabin Biplane, was exported from Australia in 1966 and is awaiting restoration by the Fantasy of Flight museum at Polk City, Florida.

Specifications

References

Further reading

External links

 Powerhouse Museum

1920s Australian civil utility aircraft
Biplane
Biplanes
Single-engined tractor aircraft